FBI Files may refer to:

The FBI Files,  American television docudrama series (1998–2006)
FBI Files on Elvis Presley, records kept by the Federal Bureau of Investigation concerning Elvis Presley
White House FBI files controversy, or Filegate, during the Clinton Administration
FBI Silvermaster File, documents relating to FBI's investigation of Communist penetration of the Federal government during the Cold War